Cyrus is a masculine given name. 

Cyrus may also refer to:

Films 

 Cyrus (2010 film)
 Cyrus: Mind of a Serial Killer or just Cyrus, 2010 thriller horror film

People with the name

As a mononym 

 Cyrus I of Anshan, i.e. Cyrus I of Persia, King of Anshan in Persia from c. 600 to 580 BC or, according to others, from c. 652 to 600 BC
 Cyrus the Great, i.e. Cyrus II of Persia (c. 600–530 BC), the founder of the Achaemenid Empire
 Cyrus the Younger, son of Darius II of Persia and Parysatis, Persian prince and general
 Cyrus and John, Christian saints, venerated as martyrs, particularly by the Coptic Church
 Cyrus of Alexandria (died 642), Melchite patriarch of the Egyptian see of Alexandria in the 7th century, one of the authors of Monothelism, and the last Byzantine prefect of Egypt
 Cyrus of Panopolis, full name Flavius Taurus Seleucus Cyrus (floruit 426–441), a senior East Roman official, epic poet, philosopher and a lover of Greek arts
 Cyrus (musician), guitarist for Norwegian band Dimmu Borgir

As a surname 
 Cyrus (surname)

As a pseudonym 

 Jackson Andrews, professional wrestler who competed as "Cyrus"
 Cyrus, another moniker of Basic Channel's Moritz Von Oswald and Mark Ernestus
 Don Callis, professional wrestler who competed as "Cyrus the Virus"
 Cyrus Smith (named Cyrus Harding in some English translations), one of the protagonists of Jules Verne's novel The Mysterious Island

Places 

 Cyrus, Greek name of the Kura River in the South Caucasus
 Cyrus, Minnesota, United States, a small city
 Cyrus, Missouri, United States
 Cyrus, West Virginia, United States
 St Cyrus or Saint Cyrus (Scots: Saunt Ceerus), formerly Ecclesgreig, a village in the far south of Aberdeenshire, Scotland

Other uses 
 Cyrus (album), a 2015 Cyrus Villanueva album
 Cyrus IMAP server, a mail server meant to be run on a sealed system
 Cyrus SASL, a free and portable library for the Simple Authentication and Security Layer
 Cyrus (ship), five commercial ships
 HMS Cyrus, three ships of the British Royal Navy
 Cyrus Cylinder, or Cyrus Charter, an ancient clay cylinder with an inscription about Cyrus the Great
 Cyrus–Beck algorithm, generalized line clipping algorithm

See also 

 Syrus
 Cyprus